Bonistan is a village and a Union Council in Panjgur District, Makran Division, Balochistan, Pakistan.

Demographics
The population Is About 26000. Major tribes Are  Barh(Rind), Kashani, Raees etc.

References

Populated places in Balochistan, Pakistan